Yusuf Emre Kasal (born 20 May 1988) is a German-Turkish professional footballer who plays for TuS Mechtersheim.

Club career
Kasal made his professional debut for SSV Jahn Regensburg during the second round of fixtures of the 2011–12 3. Liga season away to SV Werder Bremen II.

References

External links 
 
 
 

1988 births
People from Schweinfurt
Sportspeople from Lower Franconia
Footballers from Bavaria
German people of Turkish descent
Living people
German footballers
Turkish footballers
Association football midfielders
1. FC Schweinfurt 05 players
1. FC Nürnberg players
VfR Mannheim players
SSV Jahn Regensburg players
Denizlispor footballers
SV Waldhof Mannheim players
Gümüşhanespor footballers
Kahramanmaraşspor footballers
TuS Mechtersheim players
Oberliga (football) players
3. Liga players
TFF First League players
Regionalliga players
TFF Second League players